The Rampart–St. Claude Streetcar Line is a historic streetcar line in New Orleans, Louisiana. It is operated by the New Orleans Regional Transit Authority (RTA). It is the newest streetcar line in the system, as it opened on October 2, 2016, with the total length of the line being . The line is officially designated Route 49 and is denoted with a gold color on most RTA publications. 

Before the line was rerouted to its current route, it was originally called the Loyola-UPT Streetcar line, which opened on January 28, 2013. Construction started in August 2011, and the line was opened in time for New Orleans' hosting of Super Bowl XLVII. It was reconfigured to become the Rampart–St. Claude line as part of the Rampart Streetcar construction project that began in April 2015.

Route description 
The Rampart–St. Claude Streetcar line begins at the New Orleans Union Passenger Terminal (UPT) where it connects with RTA bus routes, Amtrak, and Greyhound Lines. With the exception of only two blocks, this portion of the line does not operate on neutral ground, but rather on the inside traffic lanes. It is also unique in New Orleans in that the streetcar stops are built to light rail system standards as opposed to typical streetcar stops that utilize a simple concrete platform sometimes with a bench and/or a canopy. The route continues on Canal Street for one block before turning onto North Rampart Street, primarily with trackage operating in mixed street traffic. It continues through the French Quarter and Tremé neighborhoods, then continues onto St. Claude Avenue to its terminus at Elysian Fields Avenue. The line operates the same type of Von Dullen cars as the Canal Street line. It features solar powered passenger shelters along Loyola Avenue.

The former Loyola-UPT line went down Canal to Harrah's at the Mississippi River, and on weekends, it continued further down the Riverfront tracks to the French Market terminal at Esplanade Avenue.

Although RTA literature consistently refers to this line as Rampart–St. Claude, the route signs displayed on the streetcars often show the name Loyola-UPT.

On October 12, 2019, a building under construction at the corner of Canal Street and N. Rampart Street collapsed, blocking the line. Currently, the portion of the line between Canal and Elysian Fields cannot be served by rail. For a time, the Loyola-UPT portion of the line, along Loyola Avenue, was served by Canal-Cemeteries streetcars 24 hours a day. At this time, it has been combined with the Riverfront line as the 49 UPT-Riverfront line, operating from UPT via Loyola to Canal, then in on Canal to Riverfront, then along the Riverfront line to its French Quarter terminal.

The route is expected to reopen in March or April 2023.

Operation 
The Rampart–St. Claude line normally operates between approximately 6 a.m. and midnight, with a frequency of every 20 minutes throughout service times.

Stop listing 

From Marigny to UPT

Proposed expansion 
Original plans for the French Quarter Rail Expansion called for the line to extend to Press Street, and to have a branch extending from St. Claude via Elysian Fields Avenue to connect with the Riverfront line at the foot of Elysian Fields and Esplanade Avenues, but those extensions have not been funded.

Another proposed extension would take streetcars down St. Claude Avenue past Press Street to Poland Avenue, next to the Industrial Canal. This would require crossing the Norfolk Southern Railroad at Press Street, which the railroad opposes on safety grounds.

These plans are considered unlikely to be fulfilled.

References

External links 
 Rampart–St. Claude Streetcar line schedule

Passenger rail transportation in Louisiana
Transportation in New Orleans
Light rail in Louisiana
Heritage streetcar systems
New Orleans
Railway lines opened in 2013
5 ft 2½ in gauge railways in the United States
2013 establishments in Louisiana